The Men's K1 at the 2021 ICF Canoe Slalom World Championships took place on 23 and 25 September 2021 at the Čunovo Water Sports Centre in Bratislava. It was the 41st edition of the event, and 80 athletes from 36 nations competed.

The event was won by Boris Neveu of France, winning his second title, after he led a French one-two-three in 2014. Italian underdog Marcello Beda won silver in his first international final, while Joan Crespo matched his result from 2019 with bronze.

Background
Czech Jiří Prskavec entered the event a clear favourite, as the reigning World Champion, Olympic Champion and World No. 1. The host nation Slovakia fielded Olympic silver medallist Jakub Grigar. Czech Vít Přindiš came into the event having won the last two World Cup rounds en route to the overall World Cup title, also winning the European Championships and the extreme overall World Cup title. World No. 3 Joe Clarke also entered as a favourite, and with something to prove after not qualifying for the Tokyo Olympics. Andrej Málek was the last athlete to win a major ICF race on the Bratislava course, winning the second round of the 2019 World Cup, but he did not take part after retiring in 2020.

Competition format
The Men's K1 event in canoe slalom uses a three-round format with heats, a semifinal and final. Athletes complete up to two runs in the heats. In the first heat, the 30 fastest men qualify automatically for the semifinal, whilst the rest complete another run in the repêchage second heat for a further 10 qualification positions. The final rank of non-qualifying athletes is determined by their second run score. Athletes start in the reverse order of their heats position in the semifinal and complete a single run, with the top 10 advancing to the final. The athlete with the best time in the single-run final is awarded gold.

Penalties of 2 or 50 seconds are incurred for infractions such as missing a gate, touching a gate, or not negotiating gates in numerical order. A team may request up to one review of a penalty per boat in the heats or semifinals phases, with no enquiries considered in the finals.

Schedule
All times are Central European Summer Time (UTC+2)

Results
2014 World Champion Boris Neveu topped the first heat with a clean 82.14, a day after winning the Team world title, ahead of Czechs Vít Přindiš and Vavřinec Hradilek. Sergei Maimistov won the second heat representing the Russian Canoe Federation, 1.15 off Neveu's first run time. Joe Clarke and Slovak Martin Halčin were the two highest ranked athletes to miss out on the semifinal. With both Germans Noah Hegge and Stefan Hengst setting equal times of 85.95 in the first heats run to finish 30th, 41 athletes progressed to the semifinal. 34 of the 41 who progressed to the semifinal did so with a penalty-free run.

The semifinal was won by home favourite Jakub Grigar, with a time of 85.16, ahead of Hegge and Marcello Beda, both making their first World Championship final. After the nation won 4 of the last 6 World Championship titles in this event, no Czech athletes qualified for the final, making this the first final without Czech participation since 2014. By finishing 9th in the semifinal, Brazilian Pedro Gonçalves became the first South American to progress to the World Championships final in this event since Thomas Bersinger placed 4th in 2014. This also marked the first time since 1995 that all three German athletes made the final.

Neveu became the 2021 K1M World Champion with a clean run of 83.92, almost 4 seconds clear of silver medalist Beda, while Joan Crespo won bronze at a second consecutive World Championship. The standard in the final was such that 7 of the athletes would have won a medal, had they completed the course in the same time as their semifinal.

Penalties are included in the time shown. The fastest time in each round is shown in bold.

References

ICF Canoe Slalom World Championships
World Championships
ICF
International sports competitions hosted by Slovakia
Sport in Bratislava
Canoeing in Slovakia
ICF